Man on the street may refer to:

 Vox populi or person on the street, a common interview style.

 Season 1, Episode 6 of the Fox TV series Dollhouse.